The men's featherweight event was part of the boxing programme at the 1984 Summer Olympics. The weight class allowed boxers of up to 57 kilograms to compete. The competition was held from 29 July to 11 August 1984. 36 boxers from 36 nations competed.

Medalists

Results
The following boxers took part in the event:

First round
 Ali Faki (MLW) def. Stamatos Kolethras (GRE), 4:1
 Charles Lubulwa (UGA) def. Shane Knox (AUS), 4:1
 Dieudonne Mzatsi (GAB) def. Steven Frank (GUY), 5:0
 Paul Fitzgerald (IRL) def. Tobi Pelly (SUD), 5:0
 Steve Pagendam (CAN) def. Boubacar Soumana (NIG), RSC-3

Second round
 Kevin Taylor (GBR) def. Jonathan Magagula (SWZ), 5:0
 Park Hyung-Ok (KOR) def. Nirmal Lorick (TRI), 3:2
 Satoru Higashi (JPN) def. Noureddine Boughani (TUN), 4:1
 Omar Catari (VEN) def. Azzedine Said (ALG), RSC-2
 Rajabu Hussen (TNZ) def. Edward Pollard (BRB), 5:0
 John Wanjau (KEN) def. Christian Kpakpo (GHA), 5:0
 Francisco Camacho (MEX) def. Jean Bezooki (MDG), RSC-3
 Meldrick Taylor (USA) def. Nicolae Talpos (ROU), 5:0
 Türgüt Aykaç (TUR) def. Raul Trapero (ESP), 5:0
 Abraham Mieses (DOM) def. Chris Mwamba (ZAM), 4:1
 Mohamed Hegazy (EGY) def. Avi Soodogah (TOG), 5:0
 Alex Wassa (INA) def. Wisut Meesuanthong (THA), walk-over
 Rafael Zuñiga (COL) def. Orlando Fernandez (PUR), RSC-3
 Peter Konyegwachie (NGR) def. Ali Faki (MLW), 5:0
 Charles Lubulwa (UGA) def. Dieudonne Mzatsi (GAB), 5:0
 Paul Fitzgerald (IRL) def. Steve Pagendam (CAN), 3:2

Third round
 Park Hyung-Ok (KOR) def. Kevin Taylor (GBR), 3:2
 Omar Catari (VEN) def. Satoru Higashi (JPN), 4:1
 John Wanjau (KEN) def. Rajabu Hussen (TNZ), 4:1
 Meldrick Taylor (USA) def. Francisco Camacho (MEX), 5:0
 Türgüt Aykaç (TUR) def. Abraham Mieses (DOM), RSC-3
 Mohamed Hegazy (EGY) def. Alex Wassa (INA), 3:2
 Peter Konyegwachie (NGR) def. Rafael Zuñiga (COL), 4:1
 Charles Lubulwa (UGA) def. Paul Fitzgerald (IRL), 3:2

Quarterfinals
 Omar Catari (VEN) def. Park Hyung-Ok (KOR), 4:1
 Meldrick Taylor (USA) def. John Wanjau (KEN), RSC-3
 Türgüt Aykaç (TUR) def. Mohamed Hegazy (EGY), RSC-1
 Peter Konyegwachie (NGR) def. Charles Lubulwa (UGA), 5:0

Semifinals
 Meldrick Taylor (USA) def. Omar Catari (VEN), 5:0
 Peter Konyegwachie (NGR) def. Türgüt Aykaç (TUR), 5:0

Final
 Meldrick Taylor (USA) def. Peter Konyegwachie (NGR), 5:0

References

Featherweight